Timiryazevo is a town and the administrative center of Timiryazev District in North Kazakhstan Region of Kazakhstan (KATO code - 596230100). Population:

Geography
Lake Alpash lies close to the north and Lake Kak (Big Kak)  to the southwest of the town.

References

Populated places in North Kazakhstan Region